Martin Belmont (born 21 December 1948) is an English rock and country-blues guitarist, best known for being a founding member of Graham Parker & The Rumour.

Life and career
Belmont was born in Bromley, Kent, England. After working as a roadie for Brinsley Schwarz, in 1972 he formed Ducks Deluxe, issuing two albums on RCA. In 1975 he was a founding member of Graham Parker and the Rumour, who released six albums, and of The Rumour who recorded another three on their own. Then he spent two years from 1980 as guitarist for Carlene Carter, succeeded by five years with Nick Lowe & His Cowboy Outfit, in both line-ups playing alongside Paul Carrack.

Belmont continued as an in-demand sideman across a wide spectrum of music, with sessions for Elvis Costello, Billy Bragg, Carl Perkins, Jona Lewie, John Hiatt, Desmond Decker, Johnny Cash, Eddie Grundy and others.

In 1995, Demon Records issued his first solo album, Big Guitar. His first manager and old friend Dave Robinson then suggested he should invite former bandmates to provide vocals on his next recording, resulting in Belmont recording songs with Carrack, Nick Lowe, Carlene Carter, Graham Parker, Sean Tyla, Geraint Watkins, Hank Wangford, Johnny Nicky, Barbara Marsh and Reg Meuross. Much of the album The Guest List was recorded at Goldtop Studio, with a 'house band' featuring Roy Dodds, Kevin Foster and Howard Hughes. The album was released on Goldtop Recordings/Jungle Records in September 2009 with a launch concert at Dingwalls, Camden featuring performances by most of the album's guest singers.

Currently, Belmont is playing in Los Pistoleros, The Johnny Nicky Band, Hank Wangford, My Darling Clementine and The Lost Cowboys and the newly reformed Ducks Deluxe.

Solo discography
Big Guitar (Demon Records FMCD3, 1995)

The Guest List (Gold Top Recordings AU79CD003, 2009)

References

External links
 Martin Belmont website
 Martin Belmont Myspace

1948 births
Living people
English rock guitarists
People from Bromley
Musicians from Kent
The Rumour members
Ducks Deluxe members